Arizona NewsChannel was a 24-hour regional cable news television channel based in Phoenix, Arizona. The service was owned by Meredith Corporation, and is operated as a joint venture with independent station KTVK. The channel first launched on November 4, 1996.

The Arizona NewsChannel rebroadcast KTVK's local newscasts in a 24-hour format with the ability to cut in for breaking news. The service broadcast primarily on Cox Communications channel 82 (formerly 14) to the Phoenix Metro Area.

References

External links
 Official website for KTVK "TV3"

Television stations in Phoenix, Arizona
24-hour television news channels in the United States
Television channels and stations established in 1996
Television broadcasting companies of the United States
Television networks in the United States
1996 establishments in Arizona